Charles Zhang or Zhang Chaoyang (born October 31, 1964) is a Chinese businessman, investor and the founder, chairman and current CEO of Sohu Inc (Chinese: 搜狐). Sohu Inc is listed to trade on NASDAQ and now has around 14,200 employees worldwide. Dr. Zhang is regarded as one of China's leading Internet pioneers and was named by Forbes magazine as one of the richest men in China in 2010.

Early life and education
Charles Zhang was born in Xi'an, China. His parents were residential physicians at a small arsenal near Xi'an. His ancestors were from Henan. Zhang had been interested in science from a very young age. He studied at the Xi'an Qinghua middle school (西安庆华中学) and transferred to the Xi'an Middle School of Shaanxi Province. He excelled at school.

Zhang was accepted to study physics at the prestigious Tsinghua University in Beijing and graduated in 1986.

He then received a full CUSPEA scholarship to attend graduate school at Massachusetts Institute of Technology (MIT) in Cambridge, Massachusetts, United States.

Zhang graduated from MIT in 1993 with a PhD in experimental physics. He then went on to serve as MIT's liaison officer for China.

Founding of Sohu
Soon after leaving MIT, Dr. Zhang joined Internet Securities Inc. (ISI) in November 1995 and returned to Beijing to establish the ISI China operation.

While at ISI, Zhang quickly envisioned an Internet search engine company.

In 1996 with the support of MIT Media Lab director Nicholas Negroponte and MIT Sloan School of Management professor Edward B. Roberts, as well as venture capital, Charles Zhang founded his own company, Internet Technologies China (ITC 爱特信公司). This was the first VC funding of a Chinese Internet company in history.

In May 1997, after meeting Yahoo founder Jerry Yang, Zhang decided to transform ITC and change its name to Sohu.

Sohu and its search engine quickly became a household name in China. Zhang managed to successfully conduct four mergers with other Chinese Internet companies to raise capital. On July 12, 2000, Sohu was listed to trade on NASDAQ - GS. During the dotcom crash in the early 2000s, Sohu's stock dropped below $1 USD, many board members and investors wanted to replace Zhang. But Zhang remained, and later he credited his non-confrontational style as a factor that helped him maintain his position.

Today, Sohu is one of the leading Chinese Internet stocks, with a market value of around 2 billion dollars at around $45 USD per share. Internet community blogging and short-messaging service, which helped the company turn around and generate total revenues of $750 million in China in 2002, accounted for 48% of company's revenues in 2004 and 2006.

Personal life
In many occasions, Zhang mentions about hoping he can live till the age of 150. He believes that stress plays an important role in aging and if one practices yoga and understands Buddhism, he/she can be "freed" from stress, and so live till the age of 150. Zhang also enjoys mountaineering, he has been training on Mount Everest and has reached the height of 6,666 m above sea level, he hopes to scale the top of Everest one day. In April 2017, there was speculation that Zhang was dating Taylor Swift, "America's number one singer", but Zhang denied those rumors.

See also
Sina.com
Alibaba Group
Jack Ma
Mao Daolin
Charles Chao

References

External links
 Personal blog 
 Sohu Corp, corporate information site.
 Sohu Home page 
 

1964 births
Living people
People's Republic of China Buddhists
Businesspeople from Xi'an
Chinese technology company founders
MIT Department of Physics alumni
Tsinghua University alumni
Sohu people
21st-century Chinese businesspeople